Gavin Francis Shephard (born 20 August 1971) is an English cricketer.  Shephard is a right-handed batsman who bowls left-arm medium pace.  He was born at Birmingham, Warwickshire.

Shephard made his debut for Herefordshire in the 1995 MCCA Knockout Trophy against Cumberland.  He played a second and final Trophy match for the county in 1997 against Cornwall.  He also played a single Minor Counties Championship match for the county against Oxfordshire in 1997.

Shephard later represented the Warwickshire Cricket Board in 2 List A matches against the Leicestershire Cricket Board and Lancashire in the 2001 Cheltenham & Gloucester Trophy.  In his 2 List A matches, he scored 88, although with 2 not out innings, he is without a batting average.  His List A high score was 73*.  In the field he took 2 catches. His twin brother, Stuart, played first-class cricket

References

External links
Gavin Shephard at Cricinfo

1971 births
Living people
Cricketers from Birmingham, West Midlands
English cricketers
Herefordshire cricketers
Warwickshire Cricket Board cricketers
Twin sportspeople
English twins
English cricketers of 1969 to 2000
English cricketers of the 21st century